Andrew Baker "Drew" Willison (born October 4, 1965) was the 39th sergeant at arms of the United States Senate from May 5, 2014, until January 5, 2015.  Originally from the central Ohio area, Willison graduated from Greensville County High School in Emporia, Virginia, and attended the College of William & Mary, receiving his undergraduate degree in government.  Willison went on to receive his master's degree in public administration from Ohio State University.  Willison also has a law degree from the George Washington University Law School.

References

External links 

1966 births
Living people
College of William & Mary alumni
George Washington University Law School alumni
John Glenn College of Public Affairs alumni
People from Mount Vernon, Ohio
Sergeants at Arms of the United States Senate